Manassinakkare is an Indian Malayalam-language soap opera. The show premiered on 23 August 2021 and ended on 26 November 2022 on Surya TV and starred Vidyashree Jayaram, Reneesha Rahiman, Vishnu Nair and Jay Prakash in lead roles. It airs on Surya TV and on-demand through Sun NXT. It is an official remake of Kannada series Kavyanjali.

Plot
The story revolves around the two cousins Kavya and Anjali who are sisters not by birth but by heart. Kavya is a self-centred and obsessed whereas Anjali is selfless and caring. Kavya was in a relationship with Abhijith. But she dominated and controlled him. Later he realised the difference between obsession and true love after he gets closed with Anjali. Soon he fell in love with Anjali. Meanwhile, Anjali's father died unfortunately. This made Abhijith even more liking Anjali.

On the day of wedding, Kavya learns of Abhijith's love for Anjali. She made Abhijith and Anjali marriage despite Anjali's displeasure. On the same day, Kavya marries Aadharsh; Abhijith's brother, causing Kavya's mother to hate Anjali. Abhijith's mother Suhasini hates Anjali because of past bitterness. Radhika, who is Shankar's sister likes Anjali and considers her as a daughter. Anjali had secured a good place in Radhika's heart. Kavya, Aadharsh, Abhijith and Radhika supports Anjali. But Suhasini and Kavya's mother Renuka hate Anjali.

Later it is revealed that Abhijith is Suhasini's foster son and his father is Shankar. Kavya and Anjali found that, Abhijith's biological mother is Suhasini's sister and also revealed to Kavya and Anjali that, whole property belongs to Abhijith's. They also find that Shankar is the real villain and he tries to destroy the reputation of Suhasini's business. The 'Kavyanjali' duo fight against Shankar and made efforts to expose him in front of all.
Now Parvathi who is Aadharsh's former love interest appears. She became friends with Kavya and Anjali. Suhasini offers her a job in their company, without knowing Parvathi's real identity.

Cast

Main cast
 Arathy Sojan (2021–2022) / Vidyashree Jayaram (2022) as Kavya Aadharsh
 Aswathy Ash (2021) / Reneesha Rahiman (2021–2022) as Anjali Abhijith  Anju
 Vishnu Nair (2021–2022; 2022) / Renjith Menon (2022) as Aadharsh Shankar  Aadhi
 Jay Prakash as Abhijith Shankar  Abhi (2021–2022)

Recurring cast
 Jennifer Antony as Suhasini Shankar
 Aadharsh and Rithu's mother
 Abhijith's foster mother
 Rohith Ved as Shankar
 Suhasini's husband
 Divya Sreedhar as Radhika
 Shankar's sister
 Shamnad Fasaludheen as Shamnad
 Manager of DUKE empire
 Poornima Anand / Lekshmi Prasad as Maya
 Anjali's mother
 Renjini Menon / Sumi Santhosh / Saritha Balakrishnan as Renuka
 Kavya's mother
 Nayana Josan / Ruby Jewel as Rithu
 Rajeev Pala / Rahul Mohan as Madhavan
 Kavya's father
 Shilpa Martin as Parvathi Nambiar
 Aadharsh's ex-love
 Bindhu Ramakrishnan as Rukku amma
 Suhasini's relative
 Balaji Sharma as City Police Commissioner
 T.S Raju
 Arun Mohan
 Jishin Mohan
 Deepa Jayan
 Neena Kurup as Swamini
 Deepika Mohan as Mother Superior
 J Padmanabhan Thampi as Shankoothy ammavan
 Lishoy as Mohan (died in serial)
 Anjali's father
 Madhavan's elder brother

Cameo appearances
Dhanya Mary Varghese as Mercy Paul, a popular film actress (Mahasangamam episode)
Vindhuja Vikraman as Meera Mahadevan (Mahasangamam episode)
Jay Kartik as Gautham (Mahasangamam episode)
Revathi Krishna as Preethi Mahadevan (Mahasangamam episode)
Ann Mathews as Yamuna (Mahasangamam episode)
Priya Prince as Swapna (Mahasangamam episode)
Anish Rehman as Dancer (Mega episode-Wedding)
Chandra Lakshman as Sujatha (Mega episode-Wedding)

Production

Development

Manassinakkare is an official remake of Kannada television series Kavyanjali.

Casting
Arathy Sojan who rose into fame through Pookkalam Varavayi played one of the female leads, Kavya. Aswathy, who played the other female lead, Anjali was replaced by Reneesha Rahiman. Vishnu Nair and Jay Prakash played the male leads. Jennifer Antony and Rohit Ved were also cast in pivotal roles.

In October 2021, actress Chandra Lakshman played a cameo as Sujatha, her on-screen character from Swantham Sujatha. Actor-dancer Aneesh Rahman also made a special appearance. In March 2022, both lead actors Arathy and Vishnu exited the show. Vidyashree Jayaram who played Kavya in the show's original Kavyanjali replaced Arathy. Renjith Menon replaced Vishnu temporarily.

Cross-over episode
From 15 January 2022 to 18 January 2022 Manassinakkare had a Mahasangamam with Kana Kanmani.

Adaptations

References

External links
 Official website 

Indian drama television series
Indian television soap operas
Indian television series
Malayalam-language television shows
2021 Indian television series debuts
Surya TV original programming
2020s Indian television series